Nathan Monaster (September 22, 1911 - May 12, 1990) was an American scriptwriter. He wrote for radio, television, film and stage, and was president of Writers Guild of America from 1963 to 1965. The 1962 comedy That Touch of Mink, which he co-wrote with Stanley Shapiro, won the Writers Guild of America Award win for Best Written American Comedy, and was nominated for an Academy Award.

Life and career 
Monaster was born and raised in Chicago, Illinois. He started his career writing for radio shows such as Duffy's Tavern and The George Burns and Gracie Allen Show. He then moved into work on television shows including The Donna Reed Show, Bachelor Father, The Milton Berle Show, The Real McCoys and Hey, Jeannie!. Monaster also taught writing at San Diego State University, where he taught Gary David Goldberg whose early career he encouraged.

Monaster was president of Writers Guild of America from 1963 to 1965. He wrote an Broadway play in 1964, Something More!, which was based on the 1962 novel Portofino P.T.A., by Gerald Green. Working with Harry Winkler, Monaster also wrote the 1969 television film Three's a Crowd, which starred Larry Hagman, Jessica Walter and E. J. Peaker.

Monaster died of heart failure at the Cedars-Sinai Hospital in Los Angeles, California, at the age of 78.

References

External links 

Rotten Tomatoes profile

1911 births
1990 deaths
American screenwriters
People from Chicago
American male screenwriters
American male television writers
American television writers
American writers
20th-century American screenwriters